The  Ford F-MAX is a heavy-duty truck produced by Ford Otosan. It was introduced in 2018.

It was unveiled during the IAA 2018 in Hannover, Germany. It was also chosen to be the International Truck of the Year 2019.

The truck was designed by Ford Otosan over the span of 5 years, under the codenames H625 and "Big Boy".

See also

Dump truck
Tractor unit
Semi-trailer
Semi-trailer truck
Sisu Polar
Volvo FH

References

External links
 Turkish website

Actros
Vehicles introduced in 2018
Cab over vehicles